Jacob "Jake" Dalton (born August 19, 1991) is a retired American gymnast who was a member of the University of Oklahoma gymnastics team and the United States men's national gymnastics team. He represented the United States at the 2012 Summer Olympics in London and 2016 Summer Olympics in Rio de Janeiro. Dalton grew up in Sparks, Nevada, and is the son of Tim and Denise Dalton.

Early life
Dalton attended Spanish Springs High School in Washoe County, Nevada while training at Gym Nevada under coach Andrew Pileggi. After graduating, he received an NCAA scholarship to compete for the University of Oklahoma in 2009 where he earned All-America honors and won the NCAA men's gymnastics floor and vault titles in 2011.

Gymnastics career
Dalton was the U.S. National vault champion in 2009 and 2011, the floor champion in 2011, and the All-Around Gold medalist of the Winter Cup Challenge in 2011.

Dalton was a member of the USA team that won the bronze medal in the 2011 World Artistic Gymnastics Championships in Tokyo, Japan. In February 2013, Dalton competed at the 2013 Winter Cup, where he won gold on floor, rings and all-around. In August 2013, he won the bronze medal at the P&G National Championships en route to making the World Championships team. He went on to win a silver medal in floor exercise at 2013 World Artistic Gymnastics Championships behind 17-year-old newcomer Kenzo Shirai of Japan.  In 2015, Dalton was still recovering from a small shoulder labrum tear and did not compete in the P&G National Championships.

In 2016, a new element on the parallel bars was named after Dalton in the Men's Gymnastics Code of Points.

2012 & 2016 Summer Olympics

It was announced on July 1, 2012, that Dalton would be a member of the 2012 Olympic team representing the United States. The New York Times stated that the team roster was "considered so good that it could be the first United States men's team to win gold since the 1984 Los Angeles Games."  Dalton, as part of the United States Gymnastics team, placed fifth in the team competition in the 2012 Summer Olympics in London.

On June 25, 2016, Dalton was once again named to the five-man United States men's gymnastics team for the Olympics. He represented the United States at the 2016 Summer Olympics in Rio de Janeiro alongside Sam Mikulak, John Orozco (who was later substituted with Danell Leyva due to injury), Alex Naddour, and Chris Brooks.

2017: Retirement 
On August 9, 2017, news surfaced that Dalton was retiring from competitive gymnastics.

The Mesomorphic brand
Mesomorphic is a clothing brand founded in 2012 by Jake Dalton, and fulfilled by Stars and Stripes Chicago.

Sponsorships
In 2013, Dalton signed a multi-year sponsorship agreement with Adidas gymnastics.

References

External links
 
 

1991 births
Living people
American male artistic gymnasts
Medalists at the World Artistic Gymnastics Championships
Oklahoma Sooners men's gymnasts
Gymnasts at the 2012 Summer Olympics
Gymnasts at the 2016 Summer Olympics
Olympic gymnasts of the United States